The New Cordell Courthouse Square Historic District is a district comprising the historic commercial center of New Cordell, Washita County, Oklahoma. The district grew around the Washita County Courthouse site, which was planned in 1897 when the townsite was laid out. The commercial buildings surrounding the courthouse were mainly built from 1900 to 1925; some newer buildings, including several on First Street, are also part of the district. 80 buildings are included in the district, of which 52 are considered contributing buildings to the district's historic character. The district was added to the National Register of Historic Places on January 7, 1999.

History
New Cordell was established in 1897, when the community of Cordell moved to a new townsite. The new townsite included a space for a courthouse square, and the residents of New Cordell soon applied to move the county seat there from Cloud Chief. New Cordell had a more central location and a better water supply than Cloud Chief; partly due to these reasons, an election in the late 1890s resulted in New Cordell winning the county seat, and the courthouse was moved there in 1900. After an extended legal battle, Congress legitimized the result of the election in 1904.

The relocation of the courthouse led to significant commercial growth in the courthouse square. The Bes Line Railroad (which later became part of the Frisco Railroad) opened a line through New Cordell in 1902, spurring the city's agricultural economy. Numerous brick commercial buildings were constructed on the courthouse square to house the city's new stores, professional offices, and specialty businesses. The present courthouse, the county's third, was built in 1910.

Buildings
The Classical Revival courthouse, designed by Solomon Andrew Layton and his firm, is the centerpiece of the district. Major early buildings built on the courthouse square include the city hall, Florence Hospital, an opera house, and three banks. The many other commercial buildings in the district are mostly brick Commercial Style structures. The Mission Revival and Spanish Colonial Revival styles are also present in the district; one prominent example of these styles is the Cordell Carnegie Public Library on First Street. The U.S. Post Office, Washita County Jail, and New Cordell Fire and Police Station were added to the district in the 1930s and 1940s; all three buildings were Works Progress Administration projects and exhibit Moderne influences.

References

Neoclassical architecture in Oklahoma
Mission Revival architecture in Oklahoma
Spanish Colonial Revival architecture in Oklahoma
Streamline Moderne architecture in Oklahoma
Buildings and structures in Washita County, Oklahoma
Historic districts on the National Register of Historic Places in Oklahoma
National Register of Historic Places in Washita County, Oklahoma
Courthouses on the National Register of Historic Places in Oklahoma